Gaasterlân-Sleat is a former municipality in the northern Netherlands.  Its official name is in West Frisian, the Dutch name being Gaasterland-Sloten. In 2014 it merged with the municipalities of Lemsterland and Skarsterlân to form the new municipality De Fryske Marren.

Population centres 
Bakhuizen, Balk, Elahuizen, Harich, Kolderwolde, Mirns, Nijemirdum, Oudega, Oudemirdum, Rijs, Ruigahuizen, Sloten, Sondel and Wijckel.

Demographics 
In 2010
 Dutch: 94.3% 
 Black: 0.4%
 European: 4.0%
 Arabs: 0.2%
 Other non Western: 1.1%:

References

External links 

De Fryske Marren
Former municipalities of Friesland
Municipalities of the Netherlands disestablished in 2014